American Heart Month is a month-long United States observance established by 36 U.S.C. § 101.

2009 edition 
The President is requested to issue each year a proclamation—
(1) designating February as American Heart Month;
(2) inviting the chief executive officers of the States, territories, and possessions of the United States to issue proclamations designating February as American Heart Month; and
(3) urging the people of the United States to recognize the nationwide problem of heart and blood vessel diseases and to support all essential programs required to solve the problem.

See also 
Title 36 of the United States Code

References

External links 
36 U.S.C. § 101 from the United States Government Printing Office
36 U.S.C. § 101 from Cornell Law School
Federal Register search for presidential proclamations with "American Heart Month"

February observances
Observances in the United States
Health observances